Carpathonesticus fodinarum  is a species of araneomorph spider of the family Nesticidae. It occurs in Romania, where it occurs in caves.

Description
Female specimen have a yellowish prosoma with a darker ocular area and a yellow-grey opisthosoma with a faint pattern. The prosoma is slightly larger in male than in female specimen: 2.2–2.3 mm in males, 2-2.2 mm in females.

Original publication

References 

Nesticidae
Spiders described in 1894
Spiders of Europe